The 1966 Minnesota Twins finished 89–73, second in the American League. 1,259,374 fans attended Twins games, the second highest total in the American League.

Regular season
In the June 9 game against the Kansas City Athletics, the Twins set a major-league record that still stands, by hitting five home runs in their half of the seventh inning.  Only a Sandy Valdespino groundout amidst the onslaught kept them from being consecutive.  Rich Rollins homered to drive in two, followed by solo shots by Zoilo Versalles, Tony Oliva, Don Mincher and Harmon Killebrew, with his second of the day.

On July 21, in a 1-0 three-hit win over the Washington Senators, pitcher Jim Merritt struck out seven consecutive batters in the middle innings to set an American League record.

Against the California Angels on August 18, the Twins turned their first-ever triple play, off a grounder by Frank Malzone.  The play went Rich Rollins to César Tovar to Harmon Killebrew to retire the side.

Jim Kaat won an AL best 25 games. Kaat became the first pitcher in the history of the American League to win 25 games but not win the Cy Young Award. Kaat also won his fifth Gold Glove.  He led the AL in: wins, games started, complete games, innings pitched, batters faced, most hits allowed, fewest walks per nine innings and strikeout-to-walk ratio.  The Sporting News named Kaat the AL Pitcher of the Year.

Tony Oliva led the AL with 191 hits. Harmon Killebrew again led the team with 39 HR and 110 RBI.

Four Twins made the All-Star Game: first baseman Harmon Killebrew, outfielder Tony Oliva, catcher Earl Battey, and pitcher Jim Kaat.

Season standings

Record vs. opponents

Notable transactions
 June 7, 1966: 1966 Major League Baseball draft
Steve Garvey was drafted by the Twins in the 3rd round, but did not sign.
Roger Freed was drafted by the Twins, but the pick was voided.

Roster

Player stats

Batting

Starters by position
Note: Pos = Position; G = Games played; AB = At bats; H = Hits; Avg. = Batting average; HR = Home runs; RBI = Runs batted in

Other batters
Note: G = Games played; AB = At bats; H = Hits; Avg. = Batting average; HR = Home runs; RBI = Runs batted in

Pitching

Starting pitchers
Note: G = Games pitched; IP = Innings pitched; W = Wins; L = Losses; ERA = Earned run average; SO = Strikeouts

Other pitchers
Note: G = Games pitched; IP = Innings pitched; W = Wins; L = Losses; ERA = Earned run average; SO = Strikeouts

Relief pitchers
Note: G = Games pitched; W = Wins; L = Losses; SV = Saves; ERA = Earned run average; SO = Strikeouts

Farm system

LEAGUE CHAMPIONS: St. Cloud

Notes

References
Player stats from www.baseball-reference.com
Team info from www.baseball-almanac.com

External links
1966 Twins Roster through Baseball Cards – TwinsCards.com

Minnesota Twins seasons
Minnesota Twins season
Minnesota Twins